Zulkifli is both a given name and a surname. Notable people with the name include:

Zulkifli Abbas (born 1956), Malaysian field hockey player
Zulkifli Abdhir (born 1966), Malaysian terrorist
Zulkifli Che Ros, (born 1985), Malaysian weightlifter
Zulkifli Hasan (born 1962), Indonesian politician
Zulkifli Noordin (born 1962), Malaysian politician
Zulkifli Syukur (born 1984), Indonesian footballer
Farah Asyikin binti Zulkifli (born 1979), Malaysian singer
Masagos Zulkifli (born 1963), Singaporean politician
Shalin Zulkifli (born 1978), Malaysian bowler

See also
Ahmad Zulkifli Lubis (born 1971), Indonesian voice actor
Mohd Zulkifli Affendi Mohd Zakri (born 1982), Malaysian footballer
Mohd Zulkifli Yusof (born 1982), Malaysian footballer